This is a list of universities in South Africa. For the purposes of this list, colleges and universities are defined as accredited, degree-granting, tertiary institutions. As at September 2022, only South African public degree-granting institutions may call themselves a "university", whereas other accredited private for-profit or not-for-profit degree-granting institutions tend to call themselves colleges, institutes or business schools.

Some of these private institutions are local campuses of foreign universities. Degree-granting institutions (both public and private) must be registered with, and have their specific degree programs accredited by, the Council on Higher Education.

In 2004 South Africa started reforming its public higher education system, merging and incorporating small public universities into larger institutions, and renaming all higher education institutions "university" (previously there had been several types of higher education institution). The country's universities and "technikons", which were incorporated with others and thus no longer exist, are listed at the end of the article.

Two new universities launched in 2013, Sol Plaatje University and the University of Mpumalanga. They are tentatively classified in the universities of technology category, pending clarification of their programs.

Public universities
Public universities in South Africa are divided into three types: traditional universities, which offer theoretically oriented university degrees; universities of technology ("technikons"), which offer vocational oriented diplomas and degrees; and comprehensive universities, which offer a combination of both types of qualification.

Traditional universities

Note1: By merger of existing institutions

Note2: Exact and current numbers not available, these numbers are from the University of Pretoria's wiki.

Note3: The university's business school the Gordon Institute of Business Science has a campus in Illovo and an inner-city campus on Pritchard Street, in downtown Johannesburg.

Note4: Split out from the University of Limpopo into which Medical University of South Africa had previously merged.

Comprehensive universities

Note1: By merger of existing institutions 
Note2: By merger of existing institutions

Universities of technology

Note1: By merger of existing institutions

Private degree-granting seminaries, institutes and colleges

Theological seminaries

Institutes

University rankings

League tables of South African universities are largely based on international university rankings, because there have not as yet been published any specifically South African rankings.

University research collaboratives
Cape Higher Education Consortium (CHEC)
Foundation of Tertiary Institutions of the Northern Metropolis (FOTIM)
Higher Education South Africa (HESA)
Southern Education and Research Alliance (SERA)

Defunct institutions

See also

References

 
Universities in South Africa
South Africa
South Africa